Odienné Airport  is an airport serving Odienné, Côte d'Ivoire.

Airlines and destinations

See also
Transport in Côte d'Ivoire

References

 OurAirports - Odienné
 Great Circle Mapper - Odienné
 Google Earth

Airports in Ivory Coast
Buildings and structures in Denguélé District
Odienné